The Burrowa-Pine Mountain National Park is a national park in the Hume region of Victoria, Australia.

The Pine Mountain, one of the largest monoliths in Australia, is located within the park and is believed to be 1.5 times the size of Uluru.

See also 

 Protected areas of Victoria

References

National parks of Victoria (Australia)
Protected areas established in 1978
1978 establishments in Australia
Parks of Hume (region)